Anil Biswas is the name of:

 Anil Biswas (composer) (1914–2003), Indian film music composer
 Anil Biswas (politician) (1944–2006), Indian politician